METEC (acronym for Metals and Engineering Corporation) is an Ethiopian arms and machinery industry founded in 2010. Being the state largest military industrial complex, it is responsible for the production of military equipment and civilian products. METEC works with foreign companies such as Alstom from France, and Spire Corporation from America.

Controversy

Grand Ethiopian Renaissance Dam
METEC was once responsible for constructing the $4 billion Grand Ethiopian Renaissance Dam project on the River Nile, expected to be Africa's biggest hydroelectric project, but was ousted from the contract in August 2018. Kinfe Dagnew, a Brigadier General in Ethiopia's army and former chief executive of METEC plays a significant role in the organization. The company was assigned development of Grand Ethiopian Renaissance Dam and sugar factory, as well as the Jinka Sugar Bag factory. On 12 November 2018, all assigned project canceled due to fail to complete, and government arrested Kinfe Dagnew, CEO of METEC, after a trial to escape through Sudan, where he was captured by Defence force. Kinfe Dagnew arrived in helicopter to Addis Ababa. Many METEC officials were prosecuted for corruption on the project.

Tax evasion
In April 2018, Kinfe Dagnew resigned the company after serving entire eight years, when Prime Minister Abiy Ahmed became head of the ruling party Ethiopian People's Revolutionary Democratic Front. The company remained unknown when it was operated by TPLF. In June, parliamentary committee found that METEC squandered hundreds of machinery products worthing 326.4 million dollars without study of the market.

Sources say that the Commercial Bank of Ethiopia squandered 2.8 million dollars without completion of sugar projects, and revealed the company borrowed 436 million dollars.

Kinfe Dagnew arrest
On 12 November 2018, the chief executive officer, Kinfe Dagnew was arrested by the Ethiopian National Defense Force after attempt for escape through Sudan border. He was founded with an empty briefcase believed to be illegally transporting goods. Shortly after hours, an Ethiopian Air Force helicopter dispatched from Debrezeit airbase brought Kinfe Dagnew to Addis Ababa. 40 of the company's officials were detained after they called for meeting in Imperial Hotel, Gerji, Addis Ababa.
Some newspapers quoted that they were transferred to Addis Ababa Police Commission; then temporarily jailed by Federal Police.

References

External links

Companies based in Addis Ababa
Government-owned companies of Ethiopia
Military industrial facilities of Ethiopia
Defence companies
Companies established in 2000
2000 establishments in Ethiopia
Manufacturing companies of Ethiopia